The Yungas tody-tyrant (Hemitriccus spodiops) is a species of bird in the family Tyrannidae. It is endemic to the Yungas of Bolivia. Its natural habitat is subtropical or tropical moist montane forests.

References

Yungas tody-tyrant
Endemic birds of Bolivia
Birds of the Yungas
Yungas tody-tyrant
Taxonomy articles created by Polbot